Encino Man (known as California Man in several territories) is a 1992 American comedy film directed by Les Mayfield in his directorial debut. The film stars Sean Astin, with a supporting cast of Brendan Fraser, Mariette Hartley, Richard Masur, Pauly Shore, Robin Tunney, Michael DeLuise, and Ke Huy Quan. In the film, two geeky teenagers from Encino, Los Angeles, California, discover a caveman frozen in a block of ice who then has to learn to live in the 20th century while teaching the teenagers about life.

The film was released on May 22, 1992, by Buena Vista Pictures Distribution (under its Hollywood Pictures label). Despite negative reviews, Encino Man was a box-office success, grossing $40.7 million worldwide on a $7 million budget. It was followed by a made-for-television spin-off, Encino Woman, in 1996.

Plot

During the first ice age, a caveman attempts to make fire with his cavewoman partner. An earthquake causes a cave-in that buries the two of them.

In 1992 Los Angeles, an earthquake awakens average teenager Dave Morgan. He, along with his best friend Stoney, strives to attain popularity in high school, but comes off more like a reject or an outcast. Dave is in love with Robyn Sweeney, a sweet and attractive girl who had been his best friend during grade school, and until she reached adolescence, had been rejected by Dave on several occasions. Her boyfriend, Matt Wilson, is a jock and a bully, who constantly humiliates Dave and Stoney, usually directly due to Dave's affections toward Robyn.

One day, while digging a pool in his backyard, Dave comes across a chunk of ice that has the body of a man in it. He leaves the ice block unattended in the garage and space heaters left on cause the ice to melt, releasing the caveman.

When the boys return home, they find hand paint covering the walls and the house in disarray. Investigating a beeping smoke alarm, they discover the caveman in Dave's bedroom, attempting to start a fire. At first, he panics at the sight of them and the sound of a telephone, but Stoney uses the flame of a lighter to mesmerize and calm him. After bathing him and trimming him to look like an average teenager, Dave names him "Link" as in the missing link.

They manage to get him some clothes and fool Dave's parents and sister into thinking he is actually an Estonian exchange student sent to live with them. They enroll him in school, where Link's bizarre behavior and supreme athletic skills shoot Dave and Stoney to popularity by association. This allows Dave to get closer to Robyn, causing Matt's anger and frustration.

Soon, Stoney's bizarre attitude apparently is having an effect on Link's actions and speech, which causes a rift between Dave and Stoney. Matt's anger and frustration leads to a fight with Link at a skating rink and increases due to Robyn's growing attraction towards Link.

During a school field trip to a natural history museum, Link gets upset realizing that the cavepeople he knew are all dead. Stoney and Dave console Link that he is not without friends in this time, causing the trio to make a pact. During Driver's ed, Link drives away in a car with Dave, Stoney, and Robyn in it, they stop at a dance club and Dave and Link are arrested. Dave, who has had enough of Link's shenanigans and upset that Robyn chooses to go to the prom with Link, tries to abandon him, and a fight between Dave and Stoney causes Link to come running back and separate the friends. Stoney and Dave reconcile.

On prom night, Link is a hit at the party with Robyn as his date, while Dave stays in for the evening. Matt breaks into Dave's bedroom and steals photographic evidence that Link is a caveman. As Dave and Stoney go after Matt and his friends, another earthquake happens. Matt uncovers the "freak" at the prom, but his plan backfires, as the information makes Link even more popular. Matt is left humiliated, Dave and Robyn make up, and the three boys lead the entire prom in an impromptu caveman-like dance with Infectious Grooves providing the music.

After the prom, some of the students attend Dave's house for a pool party, where Dave and Robyn kiss. Meanwhile, Stoney and Link follow clues (similar to when they found him) ranging from breast prints on the slider and paint covering the walls. They follow the muddy footprints to the bathroom and discover a beautiful cavewoman in the bathtub, who turns out to be Link's partner from the beginning of the film. He joins her in the bathtub as Stoney cheers them on and embraces her happily. She is also made to look like a modern human.

Cast

Production
Encino Man was directed by Les Mayfield, a veteran of behind-the-scenes promotional documentaries, making his feature-film debut. The film was shot from December 1991 to February 1992.

Pauly Shore was known for his show Totally Pauly on MTV, and Disney expected this would bring an existing audience to the film. The film tested well with teen audiences, and Mayfield thanked Wayne's World, which was released three months before Encino Man, for showing a comedy aimed at this demographic could do well.

Costume designer Marie France decided not to buy clothes; instead she custom-made the wardrobe for the characters of Stoney and Link. For Shore, she took his own unusual style and gave it a younger look.

Reception

Box office
The film was a box-office success. The film made $9.9 million in its opening weekend, coming in fourth at the box office. The film went on to earn a total of $40.7 million at the North American box office on a budget of $7.5 million. The film was released in the United Kingdom on September 25, 1992, titled California Man, and opened at number five.

Critical response

On Rotten Tomatoes, the film has an approval rating of 15% based on 34 reviews, with an average rating of 3.5/10. The website's critical consensus reads: "Encino Man isn't the first unabashedly silly comedy to embrace its stupidity and amass a cult following, but whether or not it works for you will largely be determined by your tolerance for Pauly Shore." On Metacritic, the film has a weighted average score of 25 out of 100 based on 20 critics, indicating "generally unfavorable reviews". Audiences surveyed by CinemaScore gave the film an average grade of "A" on an A+ to F scale.

Variety panned the film, saying "Encino Man is a mindless would-be comedy aimed at the younger set. Low-budget quickie is insulting even within its own no-effort parameters". Peter Rainer of the Los Angeles Times wrote: "There are a lot of funny ideas in Encino Man that don't come off because the director, Les Mayfield, and his screenwriter, Shawn Schepps, don't seem to have made up their minds how smart they want to be. A scene like Link freaking out during a visit to the La Brea tar pits museum should count for a lot more than it does here".

Pauly Shore's performance in Encino Man won him the Razzie Award for Worst New Star.

Derivative works
The film was the basis for a book titled Stoney's Encino High Notebook.

A made for television movie, Encino Woman, aired on April 20, 1996, on ABC.

According to Shore, Disney+ was discussing a sequel, as of May 2022, with the possibility of him, Astin and Fraser back as their characters.

In popular culture
Link, again played by Fraser, makes a cameo appearance in the film Son-in-Law (1993), which also stars Pauly Shore. Fraser also briefly appears as a soldier with the name "Link" on his fatigues in In the Army Now starring Shore.

In Evan Wright's book about the 2003 invasion of Iraq, Generation Kill, the U.S. Marine company commander is nicknamed Encino Man, supposedly for his incompetence. In the 2008 HBO miniseries of adaptation of the book, the officer is played by Brian Patrick Wade. The South Park episode "Prehistoric Ice Man" (1999) was a parody of the film, wherein the boys find a man who has been frozen in ice since 1996.

At the 95th Academy Awards, the film was referred to by Jimmy Kimmel in his opening monologue, saying it is a great night for Brendan Fraser and Ke Huy Quan (who were respectively nominated for Best Actor in The Whale and Best Supporting Actor in Everything Everywhere All at Once) "and a terrible night for Pauly Shore". Both later went on to win their awards. Shore wrote on Twitter that he "loved" the joke about him.

See also
 Blast from the Past
 Hibernatus
 Iceman (1984 film)
 "The Resurrection of Jimber-Jaw"

References

External links
 
 
 
 

1990s high school films
1992 directorial debut films
1992 comedy films
1990s American films
1992 films
1990s fantasy comedy films
1990s teen comedy films
American buddy comedy films
American fantasy comedy films
American teen comedy films
1990s buddy comedy films
Cryonics in fiction
Rip Van Winkle-type stories
1990s English-language films
Fictional cryonically preserved characters
Films about proms
Films about friendship
Films about school violence
Films directed by Les Mayfield
Films set in the San Fernando Valley
Films shot in California
Films shot in Los Angeles
Golden Raspberry Award winning films
Hollywood Pictures films
Films about cavemen
Films scored by J. Peter Robinson